In the Matter of Britain, Igraine is the mother of King Arthur. Igraine is also known in Latin as Igerna, in Welsh as Eigr (Middle Welsh Eigyr), in French as Ygraine (Old French Ygerne or Igerne), in Le Morte d'Arthur as Ygrayne—often modernised as Igraine or Igreine—and in Parzival as Arnive. She becomes the wife of Uther Pendragon, after the death of her first husband, Gorlois.

Geoffrey of Monmouth and Welsh tradition 
In Geoffrey of Monmouth's Historia Regum Britanniae, Igerna enters the story as the wife of Gorlois, Duke of Cornwall.  In Thomas Malory's Le Morte d'Arthur, her daughters by Gorlois are Elaine, Morgause and Morgan le Fay. In the Brut Tysilio, Cador of Cornwall is their son. John Hardyng's Chronicle calls Cador Arthur's brother "of his mother's syde". 

Geoffrey describes her as one "whose beauty surpassed that of all the women of Britain." King Uther Pendragon falls in love with her and attempts to force his attentions on her at his court. She informs her husband, who departs with her to Cornwall without asking leave. This sudden departure gives Uther Pendragon an excuse to make war on Gorlois. In Layamon's Brut, Igraine "was sorry and sorrowful at heart / that so many men should be lost for her".  

Gorlois conducts the war from the castle of Dimilioc but places his wife in safety in Tintagel Castle. Disguised as Gorlois by Merlin, Uther Pendragon is able to enter Tintagel to satisfy his lust. He manages to rape Igraine by deceit – she believes that she is lying with her husband and becomes pregnant with Arthur. Her husband Gorlois dies in battle that same night. Geoffrey does not say, and later accounts disagree, as to whether Gorlois died before or after Arthur was begotten. Uther Pendragon later marries Igraine. Geoffrey says "from that day on they lived together as equals, united by their great love for each other". Geoffrey does not indicate whether Igraine ever learned of Uther's deception. Layamon says "Uther greeted Ygaerne, noblest of wives, and sent her token what they had spoken in bed; he commanded her that she should give up the castle quickly – there was no other way, for her lord was dead."

Malory has Arthur, who had been raised by Sir Ector, meet his mother for the first time after he had grown to manhood and become king.  

According to Geoffrey, Igraine also bore a daughter, Anna, to Uther Pendragon, and this Anna later becoming the mother of Gawain and Mordred.

Other medieval accounts  
Igraine is indirectly mentioned several times in the 11th/12th century Welsh text Culhwch and Olwen as the unnamed mother of Arthur. Culhwch is given as Arthur's cousin, though it is not said whether this is through his father Cilydd (son of Celyddon) or his mother Goleuddydd (daughter of Amlawdd Wledig), nor whether through Igraine or Arthur's father. Culhwch and Olwen lists several brothers of Arthur's mother: Llysgadrudd Emys, Gwrbothu Hen, Gweir Gwrhyd Ennwir, and Gweir Paladyr Hir. It also says she had another son, Gormant, to Ricca, the chief elder of Cornwall. The 12th century Life of St Illtud says Illtud was the son of Rieingulid (daughter of Amlawdd Wledig), and cousin to Arthur, reinforcing the connection between Igraine, Rieingulid, and Goleuddydd as three of the many children of Amlawdd Wledig, which was set out in later genealogies. When combined with the two previous sources, the Brut Dingestow suggests that Arthur's mother was named Eigyr. Welsh genealogies list Eigyr's mother as Gwen (daughter of Cunedda Wledig), and her father Amlawdd Wledig is made a descendant of Joseph of Arimathea's sister Enigeus. Around 1400, Glastonbury monks modified the genealogies to make the Maimed King either Igraine's grandfather or great-grandfather through Amlawdd Wledig.

In Robert de Boron's poem Merlin, Igraine's previous husband is an unnamed Duke of Tintagel and it is by him that she becomes the mother of two unnamed daughters. One marries King Lot and by him becomes the mother of Gawain, Mordred, Gaheriet, and Guerrehet. A second daughter, also unnamed in some variants but in some named Morgaine, is married to King Nentres of Garlot, who is identified with Budic II of Brittany. According to Robert de Boron, Igraine died before her second husband. A third illegitimate daughter of the Duke of Tintagel is sent to a school and there learns so much, she becomes the great sorceress Morgan the Fairy (no other medieval accounts state that Morgan is illegitimate and therefore, as in this version, Arthur's stepsister).

In the Lancelot-Grail cycle's Vulgate Merlin, Igraine is provided with two earlier husbands, one named Hoel who is the father of two daughters: Gawain's mother and a daughter named Blasine who marries King Nentres of Garlot. After Hoel's death, Ygraine marries the Duke of Tintagel and by him becomes mother of three more daughters: a third daughter who marries a King Briadas and becomes mother of King Angusel of Scotland (in no other extant text made Arthur's nephew), a fourth daughter named Hermesent who marries King Urien of Rheged and becomes mother of Ywain the Great, and a fifth daughter, Morgan. In other accounts, Ywain is not Arthur's nephew, although sometimes, he is Gawain's cousin when their respective fathers are presented as brothers.

Le Morte d'Arthur names the first daughter Margawse, the second Elayne and the third Morgan. Lancelot is the son of Arthur's sister Clarine in Ulrich von Zatzikhoven's Lanzelet, Caradoc is Arthur's sister's son in the Prose Lancelot, Percival is son of Arthur's sister Acheflour in the English romance Syr Percyvelle. Arthurian tales are not consistent with one another and sisters of Arthur seem to have been created at desire by any storyteller who wished to make a hero into Arthur's nephew.

Some romances show her alive after Uther's death. In Chrétien de Troyes' Perceval, the Story of the Grail she and her daughter Gawain's mother are discovered by Gawain in an enchanted castle named the Castle of Marvels, after he had thought both his mother and grandmother to be long dead. This same account appears in Wolfram von Eschenbach's Parzival and in Heinrich von dem Türlin's Diu Crône. In both of these, it is explained that Igraine was abducted (and it is hinted that she was willingly abducted) by the magician who has enchanted the castle. In the French Livre d'Artus, an incomplete alternate conclusion to the French Vulgate Merlin, it is mentioned that Ygraine dwells hidden in Corbenic, the castle of the Holy Grail. This is apparently a version of the same tradition since in the late Lancelot-Grail, the enchantments of the Grail castle are very similar to and seem to be based on the enchantments found in Chrétien's Castle of Marvels.

Richard Carew's Survey of Cornwall (1602), drawing on earlier sources, mentions a sister of Arthur called Amy born to Igerna and Uther.

Bosigran promontory fort in Zennor parish, Cornwall, was suggested by Henry Jenner to mean . Jenner also noted the proximity of Bosigran to Bosworlas (in St Just parish) , who he believed was a real petty-chief in fifth or sixth century Dumnonia.

Modern fiction
Jack Whyte's A Dream of Eagles portrays Igraine as the daughter of Athol, a ruler from Ireland. She is married off to Lot, the Duke of Cornwall and flees the cruel Lot for his arch enemy, Uther Pendragon. 
In the BBC series Merlin (S02 E08: "The Sins of the Father"), Ygraine is the wife of Uther, but dead for many years by the time the events of the series begins. She could not conceive, and so Uther asked for the help of the sorceress Nimueh so that they could have a child. Igraine gives birth to Arthur, but because magic was invoked in his conception, Uther had to pay the price of asking for a life from magic—that of losing the life of someone he treasured equally, his wife. It is Igraine's death that sparks Uther's hatred and persecution of all magic users within his kingdom.

See also
King Arthur's family

References

Arthurian characters
King Arthur's family
Mythological queens
Mythological rape victims
People whose existence is disputed
Uther Pendragon